Kozlu is a village in the Adaklı District, Bingöl Province, Turkey. The village is populated by Kurds of the Maksudan tribe and had a population of 245 in 2021.

The hamlets of Boç, Gözütek and Kömür are attached to the village.

References 

Villages in Adaklı District
Kurdish settlements in Bingöl Province